The Stone Tark Mosque dates from the Ilkhanate and is located in Tark.

References

Mosques in East Azerbaijan Province
Mosque buildings with domes
National works of Iran
Ilkhanate